Ward Thomas Removals is a British removals firm, founded in 1985 by Anthony Ward Thomas. In 2015, the firm had an annual turnover of £22m.

References

1985 establishments in the United Kingdom
Transport companies established in 1985
Removal companies of the United Kingdom